Ceroxys fraudulosa is a species of picture-winged fly in the genus Ceroxys of the family Ulidiidae.

Distribution
Ceroxys fraudulosa has been recorded in Italy, Bulgaria and Greece.

References

fraudulosa
Insects described in 1864
Diptera of Europe
Taxa named by Hermann Loew